Stefan Daniel (born February 22, 1997) is a Canadian Paralympic triathlete. He silver medalled at the 2016 Summer Paralympics in the Men's PT4. Stefan Daniel is a 2nd team All Canadian in USPORT Cross Country while competing for the University of Calgary, Dinos. In the 2020 Summer Paralympics he won the bronze medal in the Men's PTS5 category.

2 Time Host of "Project Stefan."

Biography
Stefan shares a close bond with his brother, Christian, who has cerebral palsy. Christian is also an accomplished para-swimmer and they have been able to travel and compete together as part of Swimming Canada’s national development team.

References

External links
 
 

1997 births
Living people
Canadian male triathletes
Paratriathletes of Canada
Paralympic medalists in paratriathlon
Paralympic silver medalists for Canada
Paratriathletes at the 2016 Summer Paralympics
Medalists at the 2016 Summer Paralympics
Sportspeople from Calgary
21st-century Canadian people